Achille Ridolfi (born 15 June 1979) is a Belgian stage and film actor. He studied at the Institut Supérieur des Arts (INSAS) in Brussels and began working in theatre. His film and television credits include Erased (2012), In the Name of the Son (2012), The Brand New Testament (2015), The Break (2017), and Alone at My Wedding (2018).

He received a Magritte Award for Most Promising Actor for his performance in In the Name of the Son.

Selected filmography

References

External links

1979 births
Living people
Belgian male film actors
Belgian male stage actors
Magritte Award winners
20th-century Belgian male actors
21st-century Belgian male actors